John Robbins may refer to:

 John Robbins (author) (born 1947), American author, known for his books on vegetarianism,  food, and health
 John Robbins (congressman) (1808–1880), American congressman from Pennsylvania
 John Robbins (illustrator) (died 2016), host of the public television program Cover to Cover
 John B. Robbins (1932–2019), American medical researcher known for the development of the vaccine against bacterial meningitis
 John Everett Robbins (1903–1995), Canadian educator, encyclopedia editor and diplomat
 Jack Robbins (1916–1983), American football player
 Jack Robbins, fictional character on EastEnders television series
 Jack W. Robbins (1919–2005), American prosecutor at Nuremberg trials
 John Robins (comedian) (born 1982), British comedian

See also
John Franklyn-Robbins, British actor
John Robbins House (disambiguation), multiple locations